Too Much TV is a British television programme, that has aired on BBC Two between 29 February and 1 April 2016. It was broadcast on weeknights at 6:30 pm and is presented by Emma Bunton, Aled Jones, Sara Cox and Rufus Hound.

Presenters
The show is presented by Spice Girls member and radio DJ Emma Bunton, singer and broadcaster Aled Jones, radio and television presenter Sara Cox and comedian and actor Rufus Hound. The four presenters host the show in-rotation.

The show features a number of roving reporters including Susan Calman and Funmbi Omotayo.

Episodes

References

External links
 
 

2016 British television series debuts
2016 British television series endings
BBC Television shows
English-language television shows
Television series about television